Dicymolomia metalliferalis is a moth of the family Crambidae described by Alpheus Spring Packard in 1873. It is found in western North America, from southern Vancouver Island and Washington through Oregon to California and western Arizona.

The wingspan is about 16 mm. Adults have fine black wavy lines on the hindwings.

The larvae have been recorded feeding on decaying seed pods of Lupinus species (L. albifrons and L. latifolius). They first feed from within a chamber of sparse silk formed in the cavity of a partially intact fruit. Later, they create purse-like cases. Pupation takes place within this case. The larvae have a salmon-orange body and a yellow-brown to red-brown head. The species overwinters in the larval stage within the seedpod of host plant.

References

Moths described in 1873
Glaphyriinae